Charles Albert Williams (19 November 1873 – 29 July 1952) was an English football goalkeeper and manager, who was the first goalkeeper known to have scored a goal in a first-class match.

Playing career 
Williams started his career as a youth with minor amateur clubs Phoenix and Erith before joining Royal Arsenal in 1891. He spent his first two seasons in and out of the first team, and started the 1893–94 season, Arsenal's first in the Football League, as regular goalkeeper, being in goal for Arsenal's very first game against Newcastle United on 2 September 1893.

However, Williams was in goal for some of Arsenal's most heavy defeats that season, including a 6–0 defeat to Newcastle United and a 5–0 loss to Liverpool. Arsenal signed Harry Storer in the 1894 close season and duly sold Williams on to Manchester City; he had played 23 first-class matches in total for Arsenal.

At City, he was regular goalkeeper for eight seasons, and while there he won a Second Division winners' medal in 1898–99, and became the first goalkeeper in history to score a goal from open play, with a long clearance against Sunderland at Roker Park on 14 April 1900.

He later had spells with Tottenham Hotspur, Norwich City and Brentford, making 59 Southern League appearances for the latter club.

Coaching career 
Already in 1905 and 1907 there are reports of Williams taking charge of Københavns Boldklub (KB) in Denmark. In the Danish source it is written, that Williams had quit football already in 1905.
After retiring as a player, he became a manager and took charge of the Danish national team, whom he led through the football tournament of the 1908 Olympics in London. After defeating the French B and A teams 9–0 and 17–1, Denmark lost the final gold medal match to Great Britain 2–0.

He also later managed the Danish club B 93 and French side Olympique Lillois.

Early 1911 Oscar Cox, co-founder of recently established Fluminense FC of Rio de Janeiro, on a visit in London, hired Williams to coach his club. For this Williams was remunerated with a monthly salary of £18 plus accommodation, food and two return voyages. The man who "knows all the secrets and means of the violent sport," arrived on 16 March 1911 in Rio aboard the boat Oropesa, becoming the first ever professional football coach in Brazil – Fluminense itself had been managed by a Ground Committee up to this point. With the club he won the Championship of Rio of 1911 with an impressive record of six wins, no draws and no defeats and 21–1 goals. However, the next year was disappointing, with only a mediocre fifth place in the competition, now enlarged to eight clubs. During the 1912 championship he also managed the team in the first ever Fla-Flu derby against CR Flamengo on 7 July 1912, which Fluminense won 3–2.

From May 1924 until September 1926 he returned to the helm of Fluminense, winning the Rio-Championship of 1924 and a second and third place in the years thereafter.

In Rio he also managed America FC, with which he won the Championship of Rio de Janeiro of 1928, defeating Fluminense in the decisive match 3–2. From about April 1929 until the arrival of the Hungarian coach Nicolas Ladany a year later he also managed Botafogo FC, before coaching CR Flamengo 1930–31 in 38 matches.

Personal life 
After his retirement, Williams remained in Brazil for the remainder of his life and died in 1952 in Rio, aged 78. He was buried in the Cemitério dos Ingleses in the Gamboa district in Rio. Reports say he had a son, also named Charlie, who was a referee in the 1950s.

Seth Burkett, an English born writer and former player, is Charles Williams' great-great nephew. After being spotted by Brazilian football agents while his local team Stamford AFC were on tour in the country, he signed for Sorriso EC, a club playing in the state league of Mato Grosso, where he debuted in November 2009. Burkett has received plenty of media attention as the only Englishman be playing professionally in Brazil. He returned to Stamford AFC, playing on the seventh level of English football, in 2010. Burkett's autobiography of his football career, with his time there and his family's personal history of Charlie Williams was documented in "The Boy In Brazil"  which was The Independent on Sunday 'Sports Book of The Week'

References

External links
Danish national team profile

1873 births
1952 deaths
Footballers from the London Borough of Bexley
English footballers
Association football goalkeepers
Arsenal F.C. players
Manchester City F.C. players
Tottenham Hotspur F.C. players
Norwich City F.C. players
Brentford F.C. players
Southern Football League players
English Football League players
English Football League representative players
English football managers
Denmark national football team managers
Fluminense FC managers
Boldklubben af 1893 managers
Olympique Lillois managers
America Football Club (RJ) managers
Botafogo de Futebol e Regatas managers
CR Flamengo managers
English expatriate football managers
English expatriate sportspeople in Denmark
English expatriate sportspeople in Brazil
English expatriate sportspeople in France
Expatriate football managers in Denmark
Expatriate football managers in Brazil
Expatriate football managers in France
Olympic silver medalists for Denmark